Juan José Pujana Arza (1943-2022) was a Spanish politician. He was the first President of the Basque Parliament, serving from 1980 to 1987.  Pujana subsequently represented the Basque Autonomous Community in the Spanish Senate.

References 
 Parliamentary File 

1943 births
2022 deaths
Eusko Alkartasuna Party politicians
Members of the 1st Basque Parliament
Members of the 2nd Basque Parliament
Members of the 3rd Basque Parliament
Members of the 3rd Senate of Spain
Presidents of the Basque Parliament
Members of the 4th Senate of Spain
Politicians from Bilbao